Bishop Miege High School is a Catholic high school, located in Roeland Park, Kansas, United States. The school colors are royal blue and scarlet red and the school mascot is the Stag. The school is a member of the Kansas State High School Activities Association and offers a variety of sports programs. Athletic teams compete in the 4A division and are known as the "Stags".

Campus 
Bishop Miege High School is located directly north of the Shawnee Indian Mission.

History
Bishop Miege High School was established in 1958 by the Roman Catholic Archdiocese of Kansas City in Kansas and was named after Bishop John Baptiste Miege, the first bishop of the Kansas Territory, which eventually became the current Archdiocese of Kansas City in Kansas. It is the successor to St. Agnes High School, established in 1949, named for the parish that it was founded by, and the mascot (Stag) retains this heritage (St. Agnes). Bishop Miege was instituted as a co-educational archdiocese school intended to serve northeastern Johnson County.

Academics

Kincaid Media Center
The Media Center was completed in 2003. The capital campaign included 27 inch televisions with VCRs in each classroom. The acquiring of the Old Mission school to the north of Miege for use as sports practice facilities was also included.

Extracurricular activities

Robotics
The Bishop Miege Robotics team is FIRST Robotics Competition Team 1997. The team was founded for the 2006 FRC season, in which it won the Regional competition and advanced to FIRST Championship.

Athletics

Dixon Doll Stadium was completed for the Homecoming soccer and football games in 2007. A cellular tower was placed on the site near the stadium, with Sprint and Verizon Wireless committing to utilize the tower. Bishop Miege has won 120 athletic state championships.

Basketball
The girls' basketball team won the state championship 23 times, occurring in 1978, 1980, 1984, 1985, 1989, 1990, 1991, 1992, 1994, 1995, 1996, 2001, 2002, 2003, 2007, 2009, 2014, 2015, 2016, 2017, 2019, 2021 and 2022. Coach Terry English coached the girls at Miege for over 40 years. He had a career winning percentage of .844 and a won-loss record through 2020-21 of 910–166. The boys' basketball team is led by Rick Zych, who has won the state championship in 2001, 2010, 2016,  2017, 2018 and 2021.

Bowling
Bowling has only been recognized as a varsity sport since 2005 according to the KSHSAA. They won the state championship in 2007.

Cross Country
The girls' cross country team won the state championship in 1978, 1982, 1983, 1986, 1988, 1989, 1990, 1991, 1992, 1993, 1994, and 2004. The boys' cross country team won the state championship in 1982, 1983, 1985, 1989, 1991, 1992, 1995, and 1997. The Miege cross country teams are coached by Joann Heap.

Football
Bishop Miege has won the state championship in football 11 times, occurring in 1972, 1975, 1977, 2009, 2014, 2015, 2016, 2017, 2018, 2019, and 2022

Miege is one of only two schools to win six consecutive state championships since the KSHSAA first sponsored playoffs to determine football state champions in 1969.  The other is Hutchinson from 2004 through 2009. 

In 2006, Miege went 3-7 and the following year they went 7-3 (and had a playoff appearance beating Shawnee Heights, but lost to Blue Valley West in the second round. In 2008, the Stags went 6-4 and lost in the first round of the playoffs to Baldwin. In 2009 Miege went 12–2, finishing with a 10-game winning streak. The Stags played their way through the playoffs and won their first state title in 33 years, beating Topeka Hayden by a score of 28–6.

Soccer
The Boys' Soccer Team has won the State Championship 11 times (1998, 2000, 2012, 2013, 2016, 2017, 2018, 2019, 2020, 2021, 2022) and are currently on a 7-PEAT! Their 7 straight State Championships is the longest streak for a Boys Athletics Program in school history. They also have three Top 30 in the country finishes and seven Top 15 in the Midwest finishes. The Miege Girls' Soccer Team has won the State Championship 7 times (2003, 2016, 2017, 2018, 2019, 2021, 2022) and are currently on a 6-PEAT (there was no 2020 season due to COVID-19)! They have also won a National Academic Award for 13 straight years. The soccer programs are both led by 2001 alum, Nate Huppe.

Volleyball
Miege volleyball is currently coached by Lindsay Zych Franco. Coach Gwen Pike led the program to over 1000 career wins, and she was inducted into the National High School Athletic Coaches Association Hall of Fame in 2006. The Miege volleyball team has won 27 state championships.

Wrestling
The single season record for the best overall record by any wrestler was 34-0 set in 1986–87.

State Championships

Notable alumni

Bol Bol, professional basketball player for the Orlando Magic
Montell Cozart, Canadian football quarterback for Calgary Stampeders; former player for the Boise State Broncos.
Joyce DiDonato, opera singer
Gillian Flynn, author, screenwriter and comic book writer
Jason Kander, 39th Missouri Secretary of State and Democratic nominee for 2016 U.S. Senate election in Missouri
Shane Ray, American football outside linebacker for the Toronto Argonauts of the Canadian Football League
Willie Reed, former NBA center for Los Angeles Clippers
Travis Releford, professional basketball player and former player for the Kansas Jayhawks
Trevor Releford, professional basketball player and former player for the Alabama Crimson Tide
Jeremiah Robinson-Earl, professional basketball player for the Oklahoma City Thunder
Ryan Willis, professional football player for the Chicago Bears

References

External links

 

1958 establishments in Kansas
Catholic secondary schools in Kansas
Educational institutions established in 1958
Roman Catholic Archdiocese of Kansas City in Kansas
Schools in Johnson County, Kansas